Cindy Yang or Yang You-ying (4 December 1990 – 21 April 2015), born Peng Hsin-yi (彭馨逸), was a Taiwanese actress and model. She was known for her appearances on 100% Entertainment, the youth-centered television show University, and the film First of May (2015). She was born on 4 December 1990, in Taichung, to politician Peng Tso-kwei.

On 21 April 2015, Yang, aged 24, committed suicide by helium inhalation after suffering from prolonged cyberbullying. A suicide note written by Yang expressed the hope her death would bring attention to the seriousness of bullying. Yang also blamed coworkers for her decision to commit suicide.

A funeral service was held in Taichung on 24 April 2015. At the time of her death, fans and entertainers expressed their sympathy along with their condemnation of netizens' cyberbullying.

References

External links

1990 births
2015 suicides
Taiwanese film actresses
Taiwanese female models
Actresses from Taichung
21st-century Taiwanese actresses
Taiwanese people of Hakka descent
Suicides by gas
2015 deaths
Suicides in Taiwan